Balguda is a settlement in Kenya's Tana River County. The climate in Balguda is very hot, with a yearly average temperature of 34.7°C. It has a clear dry season from May to September, while the highest rainfall can usually be seen in November and December.

References 

Populated places in Tana River County